Pearls is an album by English singer Elkie Brooks, released in 1981. It is in part a compilation album, featuring earlier singles by Brooks mixed with newly recorded material. It went on to become a major hit in the United Kingdom – the biggest of her career.

Background 
With the relative disappointment of Brooks' previous album, Live and Learn, A&M decided to release a compilation of her biggest hits and newly recorded material aimed firmly at the middle of the road audience. The new material was produced by Elton John's producer Gus Dudgeon. Pearls peaked at number 2 in the UK Albums Chart, staying on the chart for 79 weeks. It was first released on CD in 1985. Pearls remains Brooks' biggest selling album.

Single releases 
 "Paint Your Pretty Picture" (1980)
 "Dance Away" (1980)
 "Warm and Tender Love" (1981)
 "Fool If You Think It's Over" (UK No. 17, 1981)

Track listing 
Side one
 "Superstar" (Leon Russell, Bonnie Bramlett) – 3:28
 "Fool (If You Think It's Over)" (Chris Rea) – 4:58
 "Givin' It Up For Your Love" (Jerry Lynn Williams) – 3:56
 "Sunshine After the Rain" (Ellie Greenwich) – 3:24
 "Warm and Tender Love" (Bobby Robinson) – 4:09
 "Lilac Wine" (James Shelton) – 3:55
Side two
 "Pearl's a Singer" (Jerry Leiber, Mike Stoller, Ralph Dino, John Sembello) – 3:39
 "Don't Cry Out Loud" (Peter Allen, Carole Bayer Sager) – 3:46
 "Too Busy Thinking About My Baby" (Norman Whitfield, Janie Bradford, Barrett Strong) – 3:19
 "If You Leave Me Now" (Peter Cetera) – 3:50
 "Paint Your Pretty Picture" (Bill Withers) – 3:34
 "Dance Away" (Richard Kerr, Troy Seals) – 3:59

Personnel 
Elkie Brooks – vocals
Jean Roussel, Tim Hinkley, Mike Stoller – piano/keyboards
Isaac Guillory, Jerry Friedmen, Eric Weissberg, Geoff Whitehorn, Martin Jenner – guitars
Steve York, John Giblin, Jeremy Meek – bass guitar
Trevor Morais, Graham Jarvis, Steve Holley – drums
Pete Wingfield, Bruce Baxter – arrangement
Graham Dickson – engineering
Gus Dudgeon, Jerry Leiber & Mike Stoller, Mike Batt – production

Charts

Certifications

References

Elkie Brooks albums
1981 albums
Albums produced by Gus Dudgeon
Albums produced by Mike Batt
Albums produced by Jerry Leiber
Albums produced by Mike Stoller
A&M Records albums